The 2019 Diamond League Shanghai was the 15th edition of the annual outdoor track and field meeting in Shanghai, China. Held on 18 May at the Shanghai Stadium, it was the second leg of the 2019 IAAF Diamond League – the highest level international track and field circuit. 24 events were contested with 15 of them being point-earning Diamond League disciplines. The other events were held for Chinese nationals, except for the men's 200 m which attracted an international field of Olympic and world medalists.

Highlights included an Asian and Chinese record in the women's pole vault by Li Ling with a mark of 4.72 m on her second attempt (though she placed second to world champion Katerina Stefanidi who vaulted the same height but on her first attempt), and a meeting record by Lyu Huihui in the javelin throw of 66.89 m to defend her 2018 meeting title. Also in the women's events were the world leading times of 4:01.15 in the 1500 m by Rababe Arafi, and 9:04.53 in the 3000 m steeplechase by world record holder Beatrice Chepkoech, the latter also a meeting record. 19-year old Sydney McLaughlin, the fastest junior in history in the 400 m hurdles, stepped into the hurdles-free 400 m and was able to stay with the reigning Diamond League champion Salwa Eid Naser for most of the race, but Naser pulled away in the home straight with a seasonal best of 50.65 seconds.

On the men's side one of the most anticipated events was the 400 m hurdles in which Abderrahman Samba and Rai Benjamin, the second and third fastest in history respectively in the event, met for the first time in competition. Samba however ran away with a clear victory in a meeting record and world leading 47.27 seconds, ahead of second place Benjamin who finished in a seasonal best of 47.80 seconds. The 100 m was a much closer race, with reigning Diamond League champions Christian Coleman and Noah Lyles in the 100 m and 200 m respectively both finishing in a world leading 9.86 seconds. In an upset the victory was given to Lyles after an analysis of the race footage showed Lyles finishing in 9.852 to Coleman's 9.858. Olympic and world champion Omar McLeod came back to win for the fourth year in a row in the 110 m hurdles, dedicating his achievement to his aunt who died the day before the race. Additional world leads were set in the 5000 m by Yomif Kejelcha (13:04.16) and in the javelin throw by Andreas Hofmann (87.55 m).

Diamond League results
Athletes competing in the Diamond League disciplines earned extra compensation and points which went towards qualifying for one of two Diamond League finals (either Zürich or Brussels depending on the discipline). First place earned 8 points, with each step down in place earning one less point than the previous, until no points are awarded in 9th place or lower.

Men

Women

Non-Diamond League results

Men

Chinese mini men/boys

Chinese mini women/girls

Chinese mixed

See also
2019 Doha Diamond League (first/previous Diamond League meet)
2019 Weltklasse Zürich (first half of the Diamond League final)
2019 Memorial Van Damme (second half of the Diamond League final)

References

Results
IAAF Diamond League Shanghai. IAAF Diamond League (2019-05-18). Retrieved 2020-03-29.

External links
Official Diamond League Shanghai website

Diamond League Shanghai
Diamond League Shanghai
Diamond League Shanghai